Bert Cronin was a British gymnast. He competed in seven events at the 1928 Summer Olympics.

References

Year of birth missing
Year of death missing
British male artistic gymnasts
Olympic gymnasts of Great Britain
Gymnasts at the 1928 Summer Olympics
Place of birth missing